This is a list of notable people of Lakota ancestry.

Arthur Amiotte (Waŋblí Ta Hóčhoka Wašté) (born 1942), Oglala artist, educator, curator, and author
Black Elk (Heȟáka Sápa) (1863–1950), Oglala Heyoka and cousin of Crazy Horse
Black Hawk (Čhetáŋ Sápa) (ca. 1832–1890?), Sans Arc artist and medicine man
Mary Brave Bird (1954–2013), Sicangu writer and activist
Nathan Chasing His Horse (born 1976), actor 
Crow Dog (also Kȟaŋǧí Šúŋka, Jerome Crow Dog; 1833 – 1912) was a Brulé Lakota subchief, born at Horse Stealing Creek, Montana Territory, and is responsible for one of the final U.S. Supreme Court cases that unanimously supports tribal sovereignty – Ex parte Crow Dog, 109 U.S. 556 (1883)
Crazy Horse (Tȟašúŋke Witkó) (c. 1840–1877), Oglala war leader known for the Battle of the Little Bighorn
Eagle Woman (Waŋblí Ayútepiwiŋ) (1820–1888), Two Kettle and Hunkpapa diplomat, trader, and peace activist
Gall (Phizí) (c. 1840–1894), Hunkpapa battle leader
Tim Giago (born 1934) Oglala publisher and journalist
Kicking Bear (Matȟó Wanáȟtaka) (1846–1904), Oglala activist and warrior 
Lame Deer (Tȟáȟča Hušté) (died 1877), Miniconjou medicine man
Eddie Little Sky (1926–1997), Oglala Lakota actor
Kevin Locke (Tȟokéya Inážiŋ) (born 1954), Hunkpapa hoop dancer and flute player
Karina Lombard (born 1969), Lakota-descent actress
Russell Means (Waŋblí Ohítika) (1939–2012), Oglala activist and actor
Ed McGaa, Oglala Lakota author, CPT US Marine Corp F-4 Phantom Fighter Pilot
Beatrice Medicine (Híŋša Wašté Aglí Wiŋ) (1923-2005) anthropologist and LGBTQ activist
Billy Mills (Tamakhóčhe Theȟíla) (born 1938), Oglala Olympic gold medalist
Rain-in-the-Face (Ité Omáǧažu) (1835–1905), Hunkpapa war chief who fought in the Battle of Little Bighorn
Red Cloud (Maȟpíya Lúta) (1822–1909), Oglala leader
Red Shirt (Ógle Lúta) (1847–1925), Oglala chief, warrior, and statesman
Luther Standing Bear (Óta Kté or Matȟó Nážiŋ) (1868–1939), Oglala Lakota author, actor, and rights activist
Sitting Bull (Tȟatȟáŋka Íyotake) (1831–1890), Hunkpapa chief and holy man
Eddie Spears (born 1982), Lower Brulé actor
Michael Spears (born 1977), Lower Brulé actor
Spotted Tail (Siŋté Glešká) (1823–1881), Brulé warrior and leader and uncle of Crazy Horse
Moses Stranger Horse (1890–1941), Brulé artist
Touch the Clouds (Maȟpíya Ičaȟtagye) (1838–1905), Minneconjou chief
Dyani White Hawk (born 1976) Sicangu artist and former curator of All My Relations Arts gallery
Frank Waln (born 1989), Sicangu rap artist and activist
Zahn McClarnon (born 1966), Hunkpapa Lakota actor
Pappy Boyington (1912–1998), Medal of Honor and Navy Cross recipient COL (USMC)
Debra White Plume (1954-2020), Native American activist

Lists of indigenous people of the Americas
Lists of Native American people